Glen George Salmon (born 24 December 1977) is a retired South African football forward and current manager of Orlando Pirates' B-team.

Career
Salmon was born in the Rhodesian capital of Salisbury (now Harare, the capital of Zimbabwe) and grew up in South Africa.

He spent almost one decade playing in Europe for NAC Breda and FC Groningen in the Dutch Eredivisie and PAOK in Greece.

Salmon made his international debut against Algeria on 2 February 2000 and has been capped three times in total.

Scored on debut for Kempton Park in a 7–2 win over Luso Africa Stars
.

Coaching career
From the summer 2013 until the summer 2019, Salmon worked as an academy manager for Bidvest Wits. On 21 August 2019, he was appointed manager of Orlando Pirates' B-team.

References

External links

1977 births
Living people
South African people of British descent
White Rhodesian people
South African soccer players
Zimbabwean footballers
Association football forwards
SuperSport United F.C. players
NAC Breda players
FC Groningen players
PAOK FC players
Eredivisie players
Super League Greece players
South African expatriate soccer players
Expatriate footballers in the Netherlands
South African expatriate sportspeople in the Netherlands
Expatriate footballers in Greece
South African expatriate sportspeople in Greece
South Africa international soccer players
2000 African Cup of Nations players
Sportspeople from Harare
White South African people
Zimbabwean emigrants to South Africa